The 1964 Calcutta riot was a religious riot that spread throughout Calcutta in January 1964, in which the Muslim community was targeted and attacked by the Hindu community. It was the first violence to take place in the city since the 1946 riots.

The violence mainly included bloodshed attacks, property destruction and organised loots that led to the deaths of at least 264 peoples according to the official number. Though unofficial estimates of casualties ranged from 100 to 500. Figures as high as 70,000 were reported to be the number of Muslims who fled their homes.

Background
The initial cause of the violence took place on 27 December 1963, when a holy relic which was believed by many to be a strand from the beard of Prophet Muhammad, was stolen from Jammu and Kashmir's Hazratbal Shrine, (see Hazratbal Shrine Incident) leading to protests and mass agitation in India and East Pakistan. This created hatred among the Muslims in Bangladesh towards the minority Hindus and finally caused a violent riot resulting into bloodshed in the border districts of Khulna and Jessore, later spreading all over Bangladesh. Despite strict international border controls, several hundreds of Hindu refugees crossed into the adjacent Indian state of West Bengal due to the harsh conditions resulting from the riot. As they moved towards Calcutta, news of the atrocities happening in East Pakistan began to spread, resulting in communal violence in multiple areas of West Bengal. By the evening of 9 January 1964, the impoverished slums on the eastern outskirts of Calcutta began to stir.

Initial phase 
The first incident occurred in West Bengal on 6 January 1964 in the Calcutta suburbs. Cases of violence, arson, looting, and other forms of lawlessness were reported in districts of 24-Parganas, Hoogly, Howrah, Nadia and Burdwan along with the city of Calcutta.

References

1964 in India
Kolkata
Riots and civil disorder in India